Béthisy may refer to:

 Béthisy-Saint-Martin, commune in the Oise department in northern France
 Béthisy-Saint-Pierre, commune in the Oise department in northern France